German submarine U-259 was a Type VIIC U-boat of Nazi Germany's Kriegsmarine during World War II. The submarine was laid down on 25 March 1941 at the Bremer Vulkan yard at Bremen-Vegesack, launched on 30 December 1941, and commissioned on 18 February 1942 under the command of Kapitänleutnant Klaus Köpke. After training with the 5th U-boat Flotilla at Kiel, U-259 was transferred to the 3rd U-boat Flotilla, based at La Pallice, France, for front-line service from 1 September 1942.

U-259 sank no ships in her short career, and was sunk off North Africa on 15 November 1942, during her second combat patrol, by a British Hudson bomber.

Design
German Type VIIC submarines were preceded by the shorter Type VIIB submarines. U-259 had a displacement of  when at the surface and  while submerged. She had two shafts and two  propellers.

U-259 was fitted with five  torpedo tubes (four fitted at the bow and one at the stern), fourteen torpedoes, one  SK C/35 naval gun, 220 rounds, and two twin  C/30 anti-aircraft guns. The boat had a complement of between forty-four and sixty.

Service history

First patrol
U-259 sailed from Kiel on 29 August 1942, and headed out into the mid-Atlantic, joining Wolfpack Lohs from 3 to 22 September, and Wolfpack Blitz from 22 to 25 September, but had no success. The U-boat arrived at La Pallice on 5 October after 38 days at sea.

Second patrol
U-259 departed La Pallice on 5 November 1942 as part of Wolfpack Delphin, entered the Mediterranean Sea through the Strait of Gibraltar, and joined Wolfpack Wal on 12 November.

Sinking
On 15 November the U-boat was attacked by a British Hudson light bomber of No. 500 Squadron RAF, north of Algiers, in position . U-259 was sunk with all 48 hands when one of the depth charges dropped by the aircraft exploded on contact with the U-boat. The blast also crippled the aircraft, forcing the crew to bail out.

Wolfpacks
U-259 took part in four wolfpacks, namely:
 Lohs (13 – 22 September 1942) 
 Blitz (22 – 25 September 1942) 
 Delphin (5 – 12 November 1942) 
 Wal (12 – 15 November 1942)

See also
 Mediterranean U-boat Campaign (World War II)

References

Bibliography

External links

German Type VIIC submarines
U-boats commissioned in 1942
U-boats sunk in 1942
World War II submarines of Germany
World War II shipwrecks in the Mediterranean Sea
1941 ships
Ships built in Bremen (state)
U-boats sunk by British aircraft
U-boats sunk by depth charges
Ships lost with all hands
Maritime incidents in November 1942